Goran Jezdimirović (born 19 April 1967) is a Serbian former professional footballer who played as a midfielder.

Career
After playing for Sloga Kraljevo, Jezdimirović joined Napredak Kruševac in 1986. He spent four seasons at the club, making over 100 league appearances. In 1990, Jezdimirović switched to Vojvodina. He would later play for Spanish club Écija, as well as for Hungarian clubs MTK Budapest, Tatabánya and Dunaújváros, before retiring at the age of 40.

Career statistics

Honours
Napredak Kruševac
 Yugoslav Second League: 1987–88
MTK Budapest
 Nemzeti Bajnokság I: 2002–03
 Szuperkupa: 2003

References

External links
 
 
 

1967 births
Living people
People from Vrnjačka Banja
Yugoslav footballers
Serbia and Montenegro footballers
Serbian footballers
Association football midfielders
FK Napredak Kruševac players
FK Vojvodina players
Écija Balompié players
FK Milicionar players
MTK Budapest FC players
FC Tatabánya players
Dunaújváros FC players
Yugoslav Second League players
Yugoslav First League players
First League of Serbia and Montenegro players
Segunda División players
Nemzeti Bajnokság I players
Nemzeti Bajnokság II players
Serbia and Montenegro expatriate footballers
Serbian expatriate footballers
Expatriate footballers in Spain
Expatriate footballers in Hungary
Serbia and Montenegro expatriate sportspeople in Spain
Serbia and Montenegro expatriate sportspeople in Hungary
Serbian expatriate sportspeople in Hungary